Maverick Morgan (born August 24, 1994) is an American professional basketball player who last played for the St. John's Edge of the National Basketball League of Canada. Morgan played college basketball for the Illinois Fighting Illini.

Professional career
In July 2017, Morgan signed with GTK Gliwice of the Polish Basketball League for the 2017–18 season. After averaging 12.8 points and 5.8 rebounds per game with GTK Gliwice, Morgan signed with BC Prienai of the Lithuanian Basketball League for the 2018–19 season. After a brief stint with Prienai, he joined the St. John's Edge of the National Basketball League of Canada. He was released following one game with the team.

References

External links
Illinois Fighting Illini bio
RealGM bio

1994 births
Living people
American expatriate basketball people in Lithuania
American expatriate basketball people in Poland
American men's basketball players
Basketball players from Ohio
BC Prienai players
GTK Gliwice players
Centers (basketball)
Illinois Fighting Illini men's basketball players
People from Springboro, Ohio